LZ3 may refer to
LZ3 (Lanzarote), a road in the Canary Islands
Led Zeppelin III, a record by Led Zeppelin
Zeppelin LZ 3, an airship of the German Army